The seven Bar Councils in Pakistan came into being as a result of enactment of Legal Practitioners and Bar Councils Act 1973. These Bar Councils regulate legal professionals across provincial, territorial and national level. All bar associations in the country are affiliated to and work under the control of one of these bar councils.

 Pakistan Bar Council
 Punjab Bar Council
 Sindh Bar Council
 Khyber Pakhtunkhwa Bar Council
 Balochistan Bar Council
 Islamabad Bar Council
 Azad Jammu & Kashmir Bar Council
 Gilgit Baltistan Bar Council

External links